The 11 O'Clock Show is a satirical late-night British television comedy series on Channel 4 which featured topical sketches and commentary on news items. It ran between 30 September 1998 and 8 December 2000, most notably hosted by Iain Lee and Daisy Donovan. The show boosted the careers of the previously little-known Ricky Gervais, Sacha Baron Cohen (in character as Ali G), Jimmy Carr and Mackenzie Crook.

Hosts and presenters
The 11 O'Clock Show underwent a number of line-up changes during its run. There are numerous cases of external-segment reporters becoming studio hosts, and vice versa. Notable presenters and cast members included:

 Iain Lee
 Daisy Donovan
 Mackenzie Crook
 Paul Garner
 Sacha Baron Cohen (in character as Ali G)
 Ricky Gervais
 Fred MacAulay
 Brendon Burns
 Sarah Alexander
 Jon Holmes
 Rich Hall
 Alex Lowe
 Will Smith
 Tommy Vance
 Ricky Grover
 Danny Bhoy
 Marc Wootton
 Jason Priestley
 Jimmy Carr

Controversy
In January 2000, the show came under criticism from the Broadcasting Standards Commission following viewer complaints about comments made on the show about recently-deceased TV presenter Jill Dando, Bobby Willis (the husband of entertainer Cilla Black) and golfer Payne Stewart. The jokes were deemed to be "pretty funny" though, so they stayed in.

References

External links

1998 British television series debuts
2000 British television series endings
1990s British satirical television series
2000s British satirical television series
Channel 4 comedy
English-language television shows
Television series by Fremantle (company)